Dotty Lynch (July 24, 1945 – August 10, 2014) was an academic, journalist and political pollster, best known for being the first woman to be chief polltaker for a presidential campaign when she worked for Gary Hart. She also served as political advisor to George McGovern and Jimmy Carter.

She was the CBS News senior political editor from 1985 to 2005 and was a member of the CBS News/New York Times polling consortium.

In 2006, she joined American University's School of Communication as executive in residence, and became director of the SOC/SPA joint MA program in Political Communication.

Career 
Lynch began her career in 1968 when she worked as a researcher for the Election Unit at NBC. In 1972, she joined Cambridge Survey Research, becoming a vice president in 1976.

Death 
Lynch died August 10, 2014, from complications of melanoma. She is survived by her husband R. Morgan Downey and stepson Robert.

References

External links 
 American University faculty profile -  
 Videos
 CBS Face the Nation, Remembering political trailblazer, CBS veteran Dotty Lynch, August 17, 2014
 CBS Evening News, 

Pollsters
American political consultants
American University faculty and staff
CBS News people
1945 births
2014 deaths
Fordham Graduate School of Social Service alumni
Marymount Manhattan College alumni
People from Brooklyn
American journalism academics
American women journalists
Journalists from New York City
American women academics
21st-century American women